Dalfinet (fl. 1269) was a minor troubadour from the Dauphiné. His name, which means "little dolphin", evidently derives from his place of origin. Only one sirventes he wrote, De meg sirventes ai legor, survives.

Dalfinet, along with fellow troubadours Folquet de Lunel and Cerverí de Girona, was in Spain in 1269 in the entourage of the infante Pere el Gran of Aragon. They accompanied Pere to Toledo, where he transacted with Alfonso X of Castile. On 26 April 1269, at Riello near Cuenca, during the trip, he and Folquet received three solidi in pay, while poor Cerverí received only one.

Sources
Riquer, Martín de. Los trovadores: historia literaria y textos. 3 vol. Barcelona: Planeta, 1975.

13th-century French troubadours